The Six Articles of Public Security, more formally known as the Regulations on Strengthening Public Security Work in the Great Proletarian Cultural Revolution, was a directive promulgated on January 13, 1967, by the Central Committee of the Chinese Communist Party and the State Council of the People's Republic of China. Its six points directed state and Party organisations to take steps to punish counterrevolutionaries, strengthen the dictatorship of the proletariat and defined categories of "bad members of society". It was one of the main formal justifications for the mass persecution of millions of people in the Cultural Revolution. In 1979, the Central Committee cancelled it after the directive had been blamed for the large numbers of unjust punishments and false accusations that accompanied the Cultural Revolution.

The six articles

The directive is subdivided into six points, from which it takes its name. The points are:

Impact

The Six Articles gained notoriety for their use in the Cultural Revolution to persecute millions on bogus charges of opposing Mao or other counter-revolutionary activity, or simply of being the wrong class. They were used by the radical Party faction led by the Gang of Four to punish dissidents and anyone else considered an enemy. Following the fall of the Gang of Four, the Central Committee annulled the document on 17 February 1979 and charged the Gang and former Minister of Security Xie Fuzhi with a variety of crimes.

References

Cultural Revolution